Myopsyche cytogaster is a moth of the subfamily Arctiinae. It was described by William Jacob Holland in 1893. It is found in Gabon.

References

 

Endemic fauna of Gabon
Arctiinae
Moths described in 1893